The Fontenelle Apartment House is a historic apartment building in Scottsbluff, Nebraska. It was built in 1917 by G. J. Appleburg, and designed in the American Craftsman style by architect Otto John Hehnke, with "ornamental brickwork at the cornice line, at the half-basement and around the windows and vestibules [...]  dark raised face brick with distinct color variations within the coursework." It has been listed on the National Register of Historic Places since July 23, 1998.

References

National Register of Historic Places in Scotts Bluff County, Nebraska
Apartment buildings in Nebraska